Bouber is a surname. Notable people with the surname include:

Aaf Bouber (1885–1974), Dutch actress
Herman Bouber (1885–1963), Dutch actor, screenwriter, and playwright

See also
Bober (surname)